Vogar is a municipality located in western Iceland, between Reykjavík and the international airport of Keflavík. Its centre is in the town of Vogar.
The population of the municipality of Vogar is 1,161 as of 2011.

External links
Official website 

Municipalities of Iceland
Southern Peninsula (Iceland)